= Vultures (board game) =

Board game published in 1987

Vultures is a board game published in 1987 by Henry Games.

== Contents ==
Vultures is a game in which two to four players are vultures trying to obtain carcasses.

=== Setup ===
Each player is dealt three cards from the deck. These can be Flight, Fight, Carcass, and Waddle. The rest of the cards are placed facedown on the table. Each player places their vulture in one of the two trees on the board.

=== Gameplay ===
On the active player's turn,

- if they have a Carcass card in their hand, they squawk loudly and place the Carcass card on the discard pile, draw a replacement card into their hand, then turn the next card from the deck face up on top of the discard pile. The grid reference on the new card is used to place a carcass marker on the board. This completes their turn.
- if they do not have a Carcass card, the player can take two actions: draw a new card from the discard pile, and move. To move, the player either uses a Flight card to move their vulture marker the number of squares indicated, or a Waddle card to move one square. If this lands the vulture on a carcass marker, the vulture claims the carcass.

=== Fight ===
A vulture can challenge another vulture that is on the ground (not in a tree) to a fight by landing in the same square. The players use one Fight card from their hand, comparing the number on the card. The card with the larger value wins, and the winner takes one carcass from the loser. If the defending vulture has no Fight cards, the challenger automatically wins, takes all the defender's carcasses, and the defender is out of the game.

=== Victory conditions ===
The first vulture to collect five carcasses is the winner.

== Publication history ==
Vultures was designed by Mike Henry, who formed Henry Games in order to publish it in 1987. Henry Games published three other board games the same year before going out of business.

== Reception ==
Brian Walker reviewed Vultures for Games International magazine, and gave it 3 stars out of 5, stating that "If this were priced [lower] then it could be recommended, but [the price] seems way over the top for what is essentially a board and 53 cards. Nevertheless, this vulture is no turkey."

In Issue 6 of The Games Machine, John Woods noted that "it appealed immensely to everyone who played it — probably because it combines strategic thinking with a bit of lunacy thrown in." He noted that strategy is more important than luck, saying, "It's your skill that eventually helps you to emerge the victor." Woods concluded "Vultures showed itself as an (oddly enough) attractive, absorbing game of greed and supremacy."
